Sasikumar a/l Kishor Kumar (born 29 April 1989, in Johor Bahru) is a Malaysian footballer who plays for Johor Darul Ta'zim II in Malaysia Premier League as a goalkeeper.

International career
Sasi Kumar made his full international debut for Malaysia national team against Myanmar on 18 June 2011. He played in the last 6 minutes of the match after substituting Sharbinee Allawee.

On 24 June 2011, in a Non FIFA 'A' international match, Sasi Kumar replaced Safee Sali in the striker position at the 81' minute in a friendly match against his own club, Harimau Muda A. Sasi Kumar scored the 3rd goal by a header. The final score was a 3–1 win for the national team of Malaysia.

Honours

Johor Darul Ta'zim
 Malaysia Super League: 2016

References

External links
 Profile at ifball.com
 
 Tuah Bergolek Buat Sasikumar at Nusantara.org forum (from original article at Berita Harian)

1989 births
Living people
Malaysian footballers
Malaysia international footballers
People from Johor Bahru
Malaysian people of Tamil descent
Malaysian sportspeople of Indian descent
Association football goalkeepers